Wetherellus is an extinct genus of mackerel from the Eocene.

Sources

 Fossils (Smithsonian Handbooks) by David Ward (page 220)

Scombridae
Prehistoric ray-finned fish genera
Eocene fish of Europe
Fossil taxa described in 1966